I Am Not Sidney Poitier is a novel by Percival Everrett that was published in 2009 by Graywolf Press. In 2020, it was published by Influx Press in the UK. It follows the tumultuous life of a character named Not Sidney Poitier as the social hierarchy scrambles to balance his skin color with his wealth. Each adventure mirrors a prominent Sidney Poitier film, such as The Defiant Ones or Guess Who's Coming to Dinner, and incorporates a significant twist. The novel reflects a Post-black writing style by parodying the traditions of Black literature.

Plot summary

Chapter 1 
The novel begins with the conception of Not Sidney Poitier, a boy whose mother, Portia, invests in Turner Broadcasting on the ground floor. She gains quite a lot of money when it becomes successful. Ted Turner comes to visit her and meets Not Sidney. Portia dies soon after the meeting, which allows Ted to become Not Sidney's guardian. Ted gives Not Sidney free rein over his money and life, to avoid the white savior stereotype. Not Sidney is educated by a socialist college student named Betty. Not Sidney is also heavily bullied, and in order to combat this bullying, he attempts to learn martial arts. When that fails, he learns how to "fesmerize" people, which is an ability that is akin to hypnosis, and uses that ability to mess with Ted, Betty, and Ted's wife, Jane Fonda. Upon reaching high school age, Not Sidney decides to attend public school. He develops a crush on his teacher, which she notices. She invites him to her home, where she sexually assaults him on two separate occasions. She threatens to fail him if he doesn't allow it, though after the second time, she fails him anyway. Not Sidney attempts to report this, but is ridiculed by the administration both at his individual school and at the Board of Education. As a result, he drops out and decides to go on a journey to California.

Chapter 2 
Not Sidney attempts to drive cross-country to California, but he is stopped and arrested because he is Black. He is put into prison unlawfully. While being transported to another facility, the bus he's riding on crashes, and Not Sidney and the prisoner he's chained to, Patrice, escape. He and Patrice head back to Atlanta on foot. After some time, they get into a fight and are interrupted by a young boy named Bobo. Bobo takes them to the house where he lives with his blind older sister, Sis. After being taken into their home, they all plan to jump atop the train headed back to Atlanta the next morning. While they sleep, Not Sidney has the "Band of Angels" dream, in which he is a slave named Raz-ru. In the dream, he watches a high-yella woman be taken from her high-society life and be bought by his master, who Not Sidney eventually kills. The next day, Sis and Patrice begin a romantic relationship, and begin drinking to celebrate. That night, they drink themselves to sleep. When the sun rises, Not Sidney opts to leave them sleeping and ride the train to Atlanta on his own. This chapter was inspired by the movies The Defiant Ones, A Patch of Blue, and Band of Angels

Chapter 3 
Upon returning from his failed cross-country trip, Not Sidney decides that he wants to go to college, and sets up a meeting with Gladys Feet. He bribes Gladys Feet with a donation to Morehouse College for a place in the upcoming class. He's placed in a room with Morris Chesney, a fraternity brother who attempts to bully and haze Not Sidney and others while they rush the fraternity. To end their ongoing conflict, Not Sidney fesmerizes him into reorienting the fraternity around recycling and leaving him alone. While at Morehouse, he attends classes taught by Percival Everett. Not Sidney goes to his office hours, and develops a mentor/mentee relationship with him after Everett reveals that he is a fraud. While attending Everett's classes, Not Sidney meets Maggie, a Spelmanite, and they begin a relationship.

Chapter 4 
Not Sidney goes home with Maggie from Morehouse for Thanksgiving. He finds out that her family are a group of Black conservatives who are bigoted against Black people with darker skin. While there, Not Sidney experiences a series of microaggressions and is hit on by Agnes, Maggie's sister, who sleeps with him to upset Maggie. During their sexual encounter, Not Sidney has the "No Way Out" dream, where he is a doctor who loses a white patient who is not able to be saved and is blamed for his death. Near the end of the visit, Maggie's parents find out about Not Sidney's vast sums of money, and begin to treat him with a near-reverent respect. After recognizing this, Not Sidney calls them out about their colorism and causes a scene at Thanksgiving dinner. This results in him leaving their house and ending things with Maggie. This chapter was inspired by the movies Guess Who's Coming to Dinner and No Way Out

Chapter 5 
After dropping out of Morehouse, Not Sidney attempts to drive cross-country to California again, and this time his car begins to break down in the small Alabama town of Smuteye. He pulls into the driveway of a small house, looking for tools to use to fix the car. The nuns living there offer their tools, but ask him to fix their leaking roof in exchange. The sisters become convinced that Not Sidney has been sent by God to help them build their church and tell him he will be building a fence the following day. He goes to sleep, and has the "Uncle Buck and the Preacher" dream, in which he is Buck, the leader of a wagon train of newly freed slaves in the west who are running from a posse of army men who want them to work their land. He steals a horse from a preacher in order to escape. It backfires and the preacher punches Not Sidney in the face. Upon waking, the sisters tell him again about their conviction that he will build their church, but Not Sidney is not convinced. He uses their tools to fix his car and leaves. He stops at the Smuteye Diner to ease his hunger. He hears the waitress and patrons ridicule the sisters, so he decides to help them build the church with his vast sums of money. He returns, and after some struggles to obtain cash for his check, Not Sidney cashes the check in Montgomery with a clerk named Mr. Scrunchy. On his way back, he witnesses a Klan rally from the safety of his car, and watches the cross burn out before he leaves. This chapter was inspired by the movies Lilies of the Field and Uncle Buck and the Preacher

Chapter 6 
He returns to the nuns with the money, but finds they have hired a suspicious architect who clearly plans to abscond with the money. Because of his suspicions, Not Sidney only gives them a portion of the money, then goes to the diner only to be arrested for a murder he did not commit. He calls Ted Turner and Percival Everett for help, and they come down to rescue him. After being freed from prison, he finds that the person who was murdered looked exactly like him, and wonders if that was the real Sidney Poitier. A massive tornado starts to form as he returns to the nuns' house, and he sees Mr. Scrunchy and Sister Iranaeus shoveling his money into a bag. They run, and Not Sidney moves to apprehend them, but when he finds them, they are both dead after their truck hits a pole. Not Sidney gets his money back, and decides to resume his trip to California by plane. This chapter was inspired by the movies They Call Me Mr. Tibbs! and In the Heat of the Night

Chapter 7 
Not Sidney flies to San Francisco, where he is met with press and a limousine, and is whisked away to an award show. He has truly become Sidney Poitier, and wins an award for a performance of his. In his acceptance speech, he references the fact that they are strangers to him, and dedicates the award to his mom, whose grave he has left unmarked. The words that end the book, his speech, and will stand on his mother's grave are: I Am Not Myself Today.

Major characters 
The following main characters are listed in order of appearance:

Not Sidney Poitier, the protagonist
Portia Poitier, Not Sidney's mother
Ted Turner, head of Turner Broadcasting and Not Sidney's de facto guardian
Betty, Not Sidney's socialist teacher and mentor
Podgy Patel, Not Sidney's accountant
Miss Hancock, Not Sidney's high school teacher who sexually assaults him
Patrice, a racist convict who is chained to Not Sidney when the prison bus crashes
Sis, a racist blind girl Not Sidney and Patrice run into
Bobo, Sis' little brother
Mrs. Feet, an admissions officer from Morehouse who is attracted to Not Sidney and bribes him
Percival Everett, a fraudulent Morehouse professor who likes Sidney and enters into a mentoring relationship with him
Maggie Larkin, Not Sidney's first girlfriend
Agnes Larkin, Maggie's sister
The Larkins, Maggie's conservative parents.
Violet, their maid
Sister Iranaeus, the lead nun at the house where Not Sidney's car breaks down
Thornton Scrunchy, a scam artist who conspires to steal the funds for the church
The Chief, the racist chief of police of Smuteye who arrests Not Sidney and Everett

Themes

Identity crisis 
I Am Not Sidney Poitier exhibits the identity crisis associated with racial performances. In the novel, Not Sidney can never find his true self because Everett designed him to be a caricature of Sidney Poitier. He was constantly forced into a mold that eluded him; creating, as Christian Schmidt states in his essay The Parody of Postblackness...,"a mere negation of self," because, as he continues, "without Sidney, Not Sidney would not exist." Michael Buening, an editor from PopMatters, attaches this idea to the confusion that many Black men feel during situations in which they can't escape the expectations that come with their skin. From this, Buening concludes that Everett's parodied trope characterizes the experience of life for Black men as a journey of immense searching.

Post-blackness/Parody of Black literature 
In the novel, Everett engages with several aspects of traditional Black literature through parody: "Playfully engaging the fiction of Ralph Ellison, Richard Wright, and intertextually invoking his own literary oeuvre, Everett's I Am Not Sidney Poitier signifies upon the history of African American literature and can fruitfully be read as a parody of it. Following Hutcheon, I use parody not in the narrow sense of 'ridiculing imitation' (A Theory 5) but as a term to describe complex forms of 'trans-contextualization' and inversion."

This approach is characteristic of many "Post-black" authors. These authors create worlds in which race may or may not be relevant, but does not totally control or define the story. By doing so, these authors change the view of "Black literature", and try to establish that Black authors are capable of creating stories that are not entirely about the concept of race.

Critical reception 
I Am Not Sidney Poitier received a warm reception among its few reviewers, and won two awards: the Believer Book Award and the Hurston/Wright Legacy Award. Everett's supporters lauded his absurdist comedic approach in creating a character that "negates" everything he is intended to represent. An essay by assistant professor Christian Schmidt from the University of Bayreuth defines the novel as a "meta parody that thematizes the very difference between original and copy even if the sign that marks this difference is as crude and banal as the simple 'not' of its protagonist's name." This attribute of the novel, along with its experimental and fractured lens of Not Sidney, create the "coded discourse" necessary for parody to thrive. Critics, including Schmidt, recognized Everett's emphasis on parody and noted instances such as his 2009 Fuck were discredited by many "intratextual critiques". I Am Not Sidney Poitier has been classified as a part of "Post-black literature", where Black novels parody/respond to the genre of Black literature. These authors write worlds that are entirely dependent on the text itself, and as such do not address the racism outside of it.

NPR called the story a "delicious comedy of miscommunications" and "one of the funniest, most original stories to be published in years."

Publishers Weeklys review lauded Everett as "a novelist at the height of his narrative and satirical powers" and the novel as "smart and without a trace of pretentiousness".

Kirkus Reviews said about the book: "The author had some fun; the reader will too."

References

2009 American novels
Believer Book Award-winning books
Graywolf Press books
African-American novels